Mtirala National Park (Georgian: მტირალას ეროვნული პარკი; meaning "to cry"; previously, Tsiskara Reserve) is a protected area in Adjara region, Western Georgia. It also adjoins the Kintrishi Protected Areas. Owing to its outstanding relict forests, diversity of wetland ecosystems, and biodiversity, the national park was inscribed on the UNESCO World Heritage List as part of the Colchic Rainforests and Wetlands in 2021.

Biodiversity 
Mtirala National Park is located within the Euxine-Colchic deciduous forests ecoregion/ Because of the funnel-like orientation of the surrounding mountains (The Greater Caucasus and Lesser Caucasus), the national park is extremely humid, with rainfall in the area often exceeding 4 meters per year. Mount Mtirala is one of the most humid areas in the country. The name Mtirala (meaning "to cry") is derived from the  annual rainfall, making it one of the wettest areas of the former Soviet Union.

The high rainfall and topographic diversity of the national park has allowed for the persistence of a wide diversity of habitats and species. Habitats within the park range from lowland forests to mountain meadows, including sweet chestnut and Oriental beech woods with pontic rhododendron, cherry laurel and Colchic box understories and a variety of lianas. Local fauna include the brown bear, roe deer, wild boar, booted eagle, eagle owl, golden oriole, Caucasian salamander, Caucasian toad, Eurasian marsh frog, and Caucasian viper. In addition, Mtirala National Park is located along the "Batumi bottleneck", which is a convergence zone for migrating raptor species. In total, more than 1 million raptors of 35 different species migrate through the park in the autumn, including greater than 50% of the global populations of the booted eagle and European honey-buzzard.

See also 
Euxine-Colchic deciduous forests

References

External links

National parks of Georgia (country)
Geography of Adjara
Tourist attractions in Adjara